Gabriel Charles Revault d'Allonnes (6 January 1872 - 12 February 1949) was a French psychologist best known for his study of the psychology of attention.

Works

 (helping Frédéric Rauh), Psychologie appliquée à la morale et à l'éducation, 1900
 'Délire de persécution à trois avec séquestration volontaire', Journal de psychologue normale et pathologique, No.2, March–April 1905
 'Role des sensations internes dans les emotions et dans la perception de la duree', Revue Philosophique, December 1905, pp. 592 ff.
 Psychologie d'une religion, 1907
 Les Inclinations, leur rôle dans la psychologie des sentiments, 1907
 (ed.) Lamarck, [selection of writings] by Jean-Baptiste Lamarck, 1910
 L'affaiblissement intellectuel chez les déments: étude clinique par la méthode d'observation expérimentale, 1911, Dissertation.
 'A Guide for the Psychological Examination of Normal People', Psychologie et la Vie 3 (1929), 11-13
 'Les formes supérieures de l'attention', Journal de Psychologie

References

French psychologists
1872 births
1949 deaths